Hanx! is a live punk album by the band Stiff Little Fingers, released in 1980. Originally intended for the American market, in order to introduce the band before they toured there, it was subsequently released at a budget price in the UK, for the band were concerned that a lot of their fans would insist on buying the album on import anyway for a higher price. Jake Burns remarks on the sleeve notes for the CD reissue that only "Johnny Was" came from the Rainbow Theatre show, with the remainder recorded at the Aylesbury gig.

The title Hanx! is a phonetic representation of Burns' delivery of "Thanks" after most numbers.

Track listing
"Nobody's Hero" (Jake Burns, Gordon Ogilvie) – 4:03
"Gotta Gettaway" (Fingers, Ogilvie) – 2:23
"Wait and See" (Burns, Ogilvie) – 4:19
"Barbed Wire Love" (Fingers, Ogilvie) – 3:25
"Fly the Flag" (Fingers, Ogilvie) – 3:28
"Alternative Ulster" (Fingers, Ogilvie) – 3:01
"Johnny Was" (Bob Marley) – 10:09
"At the Edge" (Fingers) – 2:38
"Wasted Life" (Burns) – 3:28
"Tin Soldiers" (Fingers, Ogilvie) – 5:02
"Suspect Device" (Fingers, Ogilvie) – 2:17

Some CD reissues have added tracks;these are "Running Bear" and "White Christmas", both B-sides of their "At The Edge" single, plus a further part of a Jake Burns interview with Alan Parker recorded in 2001.

Charts

Personnel
Stiff Little Fingers
Jake Burns – vocals/guitar
Jim Reilly – drums
Henry Cluney – guitar
Ali McMordie – bass
Technical
Doug Bennett – producer
Bill Gill – engineer
Andi Banks – tour manager
Arthur Kemish – equipment
Bazz Ward – Livewire PA
'Side' Phil Wilkie – Livewire PA
Colin Phillipps – Livewire PA
Alan Espley – light and sound design
Steve Ruisling – light and sound design
Mike Carter – road transport
John Ferguson – security
Wally Grove – security
Dave Jupp – Keedwell Trucking
John Jackson – cowbell agency
Pete Greenslade – The Manor Mobile
Dave Chapman – The Manor Mobile
John "Teflon" Sims – sleeve design
Dave Storey – sleeve design
Brian Cooke – front cover pictures and colour effects
Iain McKell – back cover picture

References

1980 live albums
Stiff Little Fingers live albums
Chrysalis Records live albums